The Constitution of the Republic of Bulgaria (Konstitutsia na Republika Bǎlgariya) is the supreme and basic law of the Republic of Bulgaria. The current constitution was adopted on 12 July 1991 by the 7th Grand National Assembly of Bulgaria, and defines the country as a unitary parliamentary republic. It has been amended five times (in 2003, 2005, 2006, 2007, and 2015).

Chronologically, it is the fourth constitution of Bulgaria, the first being the Tarnovo Constitution of 1879. It was immediately preceded by the two Socialist-era constitutions–the Dimitrov Constitution (named after Georgi Dimitrov), in force between 1947 and 1971, and the Zhivkov Constitution (named after Todor Zhivkov), in force between 1971 and 1991.

Content

Political System

Distribution of powers 
The constitution sets about a parliamentary form of government, in which executive power is rested upon the Government of Bulgaria, legislative power within National Assembly and judicial power is distributed through the judicial institutions, with the Supreme Judicial Council at its head. The institution of President of Bulgaria is created as an arbiter between the other branches of government and wields mostly ceremonial powers, most notable of which is his position as Commander-in-chief of the Armed forces of Bulgaria.

Government formation 
The Bulgarian government is nominally appointed by the President, but the latter must follow strict protocol during said appointment. When government formation takes place, the President is obliged to give the first mandate over to the largest party or faction within the national assembly. That faction then puts forward its proposed government, when is then put to a vote in the assembly. For the government to be elected, it needs to obtain the support of a majority of elected representatives during a session in which there is a quorum. Should the largest party refuse the mandate, or should it fail to secure the support of a majority in the house, the President is then obliged to hand the mandate over to the second largest party or faction. Only if the second largest faction also fails to form a government is the President allowed to exercise discretion appointing a temporary caretaker government until new elections can be held.

Society

Identity 
The Bulgarian constitution states that the territorial integrity of the country is "inviolable" and expressly forbids any autonomous territorial formations from being allowed to exist. The Bulgarian language is designated as the country's only official language.

Religion 
The constitution establishes the Eastern Orthodox Church as "a traditional religion in the Republic of Bulgaria", but states that religious institutions must be separate from the state and forbids religious communities and institutions from being used for political purposes. It also prohibits the formation of political parties based on religious or racial/ethnic affiliation.

Marriage 
Marriage is defined as a "voluntary union between a man and a woman", explicitly rejecting any marriages other than civil marriages concluded under this clause, thus effectively prohibiting both same-sex and polygamous marriages.

Amendments to the constitution 
Amendments to most parts of the constitution may be adopted by the ordinary National Assembly, but the adoption of an entirely new constitution or the alteration of key articles, such as those pertaining to the form of state organization or national territory can only be adopted through the calling of a Grand National Assembly of Bulgaria. The Grand National Assembly is an extended National Assembly composed of 400 elected representatives, instead of the 240 in the ordinary National Assembly. It is tasked specifically with making major alterations to the nation's constitution and is dissolved following the completion of the amendment process.

In either case, constitutional amendments may only be proposed either by 25% of the elected representatives within the assembly or by the President and require a 66% supermajority of elected representatives in order to be adopted.

Proposed 2020 amendments 
During the 2020–2021 Bulgarian protests, Prime Minister Boyko Borisov announced that he would back a change in the country's constitution. The proposal tabled by his party would call for a Grand National Assembly in order to discuss the changes. Among them was a proposal to scrap the institution of the Grand National Assembly altogether, reduce the terms of judges and prosecutors and reduce the number of elected representatives in the ordinary National Assembly from 240 to 120. His proposals were supported by his coalition partners in the SDS and conditionally by the VMRO, pending additional amendments to return conscription and adopt further articles prohibiting same-sex marriage, among others. The Volya Movement did not comment on the proposals, but rejected the government's calls for Grand National Assembly elections. Democratic Bulgaria tacitly supported the proposals, while President Rumen Radev, the opposition Bulgarian Socialist Party and There Are Such People parties and opposition leader Maya Manolova rejected them outright. Likewise, the proposals were also mostly rejected by the protesters on the streets.

See also

Former constitutions 
 Tarnovo Constitution (1879)
 Dimitrov Constitution (1947)
 Zhivkov Constitution (1971)

Others 
 Constitution
 Constitutional economics
 Rule according to higher law
 Rechtsstaat

References

External links
 Constitution of the Republic of Bulgaria

Constitutions of Bulgaria
1991 in law
1991 in Bulgaria
1991 in politics
1991 documents
July 1991 events in Europe